This is a list of airlines in Malaysia. The airlines are sorted alphabetically by activeness and type.

Scheduled airlines

Charter Airlines

Cargo airlines

See also
 List of defunct airlines of Malaysia
 List of all airlines
 List of airports in Malaysia
 List of defunct airlines of Asia

Malaysia
Airlines
Airlines
Malaysia